United States gubernatorial elections were held on November 7, 2000, in 11 states and two territories. The elections coincided with the presidential election. Democrats gained one seat by defeating an incumbent in West Virginia.

Election results

States

Territories

Closest races 
States where the margin of victory was under 1%:
 Missouri, 0.9%

States where the margin of victory was under 5%:
 American Samoa, 2.8%
 West Virginia, 2.9%
 Puerto Rico, 3.0%
 Montana, 3.9%

States where the margin of victory was under 10%:
 New Hampshire, 5.0%
 North Carolina, 5.8%

See also
2000 United States elections
2000 United States presidential election
2000 United States Senate elections
2000 United States House of Representatives elections

Notes

References